Nmairiyeh  is a village in the Nabatieh District in southern Lebanon.

History
In  the 1596 tax records, it was named as a village,  Numayriyya, in the Ottoman nahiya (subdistrict) of Sagif under the liwa' (district) of Safad, with a population of  23  households and 6 bachelors, all Muslim. The villagers paid a fixed  tax-rate of 25%  on  agricultural products, such as wheat, barley, olive trees, goats and beehives, in addition to  "occasional revenues" and a press for olive oil or grape syrup; a total of 2,492 akçe.

Modern era
On  July 29, 2006, during the 2006 Lebanon War,   Israeli war-planes killed 6 civilians, aged 8 to 56 years old. There were no Hizbollah presence in the village at the time of the attack.

References

Bibliography

External links
 Nmairiyeh, Localiban

Populated places in Nabatieh District